Tritoniopsis frydis is a species of dendronotid nudibranch, a marine gastropod mollusc in the family Tritoniidae.

Description 
The maximum recorded body length is 20 mm.

Habitat 
Minimum recorded depth is 2 m. Maximum recorded depth is 3 m.

References

External links

Tritoniidae
Gastropods described in 1970
Taxa named by Eveline Du Bois-Reymond Marcus
Taxa named by Ernst Marcus (zoologist)